Volumes of Blood is a 2015 American horror anthology film directed by P. J. Starks (segment "Ghastly"), Jakob Bilinski (segment "13 After Midnight"), Nathan Thomas Milliner (segment "The Encyclopedia Satanica"), John Kenneth Muir (segment "A Little Pick Me Up"), and Lee Vervoort (segment "That’s A Wrap!"). It stars Kristine Renee Farley, Jason Crowe, Jim O'Rear, and Roni Jonah.

Premise
A sociology student and three friends meet in a library and craft four new urban legends.

Production
Director P. J. Starks and Jim Blanton of the Daviess County Public Library in Owensboro, Kentucky developed the "Unscripted Film School" program so people from Owensboro could experience filmmaking for themselves. Their first project was an eight minute horror short and their second would be Volumes of Blood. Using Kickstarter, the crew raised over $4,000 for the film.

Reception
JoBlo.com awarded the film 7/10. Bloody Disgusting called the film "the Best Damn Anthology This Year."Dread Central awarded the film 3.5 stars and praised it to have "all the right bits in place to entertain the horror masses"

Sequels
In a 2015 interview, P. J. Starks said he had ideas for a second and third volume. A sequel, entitled Volumes of Blood: Horror Stories, premiered on October 29, 2016 at the Owensboro Convention Center in Owensboro, Ky. Fangoria has called it "hands down, the most entertaining anthology in years." In an interview with Dread Central, producer P. J. Stark announced a second and final sequel called Devil's Knight: Volumes of Blood 3.

References

External links
 Volumes of Blood

2015 films
2015 horror films
American teen horror films
American horror anthology films
American independent films
2010s English-language films
2010s American films